Live in Seattle is a live album by American keyboardist and composer Wayne Horvitz' Zony Mash recorded in 2001 and released on the Liquid City label.

Reception
The Allmusic review by Sean Westergaard awarded the album 3½ stars stating "this is a great-sounding example of what Zony Mash can do with a little more room to stretch out... Live in Seattle is a great set from a great band. Highly recommended".

Track listing
All compositions by Wayne Horvitz except as indicated
 "Meet the Zony Mash" - 7:03 
 "Slide By" - 10:12 
 "Bad Traffic" - 9:40 
 "In the Lounge" - 7:37 
 "Let's Get Mashed" - 5:07 
 "Upper Egypt" (Pharoah Sanders) - 9:27 
 "Spice Rack" - 7:31 
Recorded live at The Rainbow in Seattle, Washington in May and June 2001

Personnel
Wayne Horvitz - Hammond B-3 organ, Nord Lead, DX-7
Timothy Young - electric guitar
Keith Lowe - electric bass
Andy Roth - drums

References

Wayne Horvitz albums
2002 live albums